Sheikh Bastami Mosque is located in Semnan Province, Bastam, downtown.

References

Mosques in Iran
Mosque buildings with domes
National works of Iran
Buildings and structures in Semnan Province